The Tarpon Springs Cultural Center includes the Center for Gulf Coast Folklife and located in Tarpon Springs, Florida at 101 South Pinellas Avenue in Old Tarpon Springs City Hall.

Center for Gulf Coast Folklife
The center celebrates folk artist traditions. Exhibitions include Latin American folk culture at the Gulf Coast Folklife Gallery, festivals (including Gulf Coast Folklife Festival; Gulf Coast Maritime and Music Festival; and Night in the Islands), performances, and a monthly Greek music and dance event. Workshops are also offered.

In 2012, Tarpon Springs received a $40,000 National Endowment for the Arts (NEA) grant to support the center.

References

External links
 

Buildings and structures in Tarpon Springs, Florida
Tourist attractions in Pinellas County, Florida
Museums in Pinellas County, Florida
Arts centers in Florida